16S rRNA (cytosine967-C5)-methyltransferase (rsmB (gene), fmu (gene), 16S rRNA m5C967 methyltransferase) is an enzyme with systematic name S-adenosyl-L-methionine:16S rRNA (cytosine967-C5)-methyltransferase. This enzyme catalyses the following chemical reaction

 S-adenosyl-L-methionine + cytosine967 in 16S rRNA  S-adenosyl-L-homocysteine + 5-methylcytosine967 in 16S rRNA

The enzyme specifically methylates cytosine967 at C5 in 16S rRNA.

References

External links 
 

EC 2.1.1